The Wanette–Byars Bridge is a long bridge in central Oklahoma. It crosses the Canadian River between Byars in McClain County and Wanette in Pottawatomie County. The bridge is on a county road, not a state-designated highway.

The bridge was built in 1902 by the American Bridge Company to serve as a rail bridge connecting Pauls Valley with Shawnee. It was later converted to a one-lane bridge for auto traffic. The bridge is of the camelback truss design and is composed of three spans, each . Each of these spans are the longest in Oklahoma.

Until 1992, the bridge had a wooden deck. In 1992, the bridge's deck was destroyed by arson, closing it for two years. When the bridge reopened, it had a concrete and asphalt driving surface.

The bridge is an oft-utilized link between Byars and Wanette. The two nearest bridges are between fifteen and twenty-five miles (24–40 km) away.

It was listed on the National Register of Historic Places in 2010 as Old Santa Fe Railroad Bridge and has also been denoted as Structure #63D3342E1446000 and as Flynn Bridge. It is a Camel Back-Through Truss bridge.

References

Truss bridges in the United States
Bridges completed in 1902
Former railway bridges in the United States
Railroad bridges in Oklahoma
Road bridges in Oklahoma
National Register of Historic Places in McClain County, Oklahoma
National Register of Historic Places in Pottawatomie County, Oklahoma
Pottawatomie County, Oklahoma